VK (short for its original name VKontakte; , meaning InContact) is a Russian online social media and social networking service based in Saint Petersburg. VK is available in multiple languages but it is predominantly used by Russian speakers. VK users can message each other publicly or privately, create groups, public pages, and events; share and tag images, audio, and video; and play browser-based games.

, VK had at least 500 million accounts. As of November 2022, it was the sixth most popular website in Russia. The network was also popular in Ukraine until it was banned by the Verkhovna Rada in 2017.

According to SimilarWeb, VK is the 16th most visited website in the world.

History

VKontakte was incorporated on 19 January 2007 as a Russian private limited company. Founder Pavel Durov launched VKontakte for beta testing in September 2006, shortly after his graduation from St Petersburg State University. The following month, the domain name vkontakte.ru was registered. User registration was initially limited to within university circles exclusively by invitation, but the site still grew quickly.

In February 2007 the site reached a user base of over 100,000 and was recognized as the second largest company in Russia's nascent social network market. In the same month, the site was subjected to a severe DDoS attack, which briefly put it offline. The user base reached 1 million in July 2007, and 10 million in April 2008. In December 2008 VK overtook rival Odnoklassniki as Russia's most popular social networking service.

Website

As with most social networks, the site's core functionality is based on private messaging and sharing photos, status updates, and links with friends. VK also has tools for managing online communities and celebrity pages. The site allows its users to upload, search and stream media content, such as videos and music. VK features an advanced search engine, that allows complex queries for finding friends, as well as a real-time news search. VK updated its features and design in April 2016.

Features

 Messaging. VK Private Messages can be exchanged between groups of 2 to 500 people. An email address can also be specified as the recipient. Each message may contain up to 10 attachments: Photos, Videos, Audio Files, Maps (an embedded map with a manually placed marker), and Documents. 
 News. VK users can post on their profile walls, each post may contain up to 10 attachments – media files, maps, and documents (see above). User mentions and hashtags are supported. In the case of multiple photo attachments, the previews are automatically scaled and arranged in a magazine-style layout. The news feed can be switched between all news (default) and most interesting modes. The site features a news-recommendation engine, global real-time search, and individual search for posts and comments on specific users' walls.
 Communities. VK features three types of communities. Groups are better suited for decentralized communities (discussion boards, wiki-style articles, editable by all members, etc.). Public pages is a news feed-orientated broadcasting tool for celebrities and businesses. The two types are largely interchangeable, the main difference being in the default settings. The third type of community is called Events, which are used for appropriately organizing concerts and events in an appropriate way.

 Like buttons. VK like buttons for posts, comments, media, and external sites operate differently from Facebook. Liked content doesn't get automatically pushed to the user's wall, but is saved in the private Favorites section instead. The user has to press a second 'share with friends' button to share an item on their wall or send it via private message to a friend.
 Privacy. Users can control the availability of their content within the network and on the Internet. Blanket and granular privacy settings are available for pages and individual content.
 Synchronization  with other social networks. Any news published on the VK wall will appear on Facebook or Twitter. Certain news may not be published by clicking on the logo next to the "Send" button. Editing a post in VK does not change the post in Facebook or Twitter and vice versa. However, removing the news in VK will remove it from other social networks.
 SMS service. Russian users can receive and reply to a private message or leave a comment for community news using SMS.
 Music. Users have access to the audio files uploaded by other users. In addition, users can upload the audio files themselves, create playlists and share audios with others by attaching to messages and wall posts. The uploaded audio files cannot violate copyright laws.

Popularity
As of May 2017, according to Alexa Internet ranking, VK is one of the most visited websites in some Eurasian countries. It is:

 4th most visited in Russia;
 3rd most visited in Belarus;
 6th most visited in Kazakhstan;
8th most visited in Kyrgyzstan and Moldova;
 12th most visited in Latvia.

It was the fourth most viewed site in Ukraine until, in May 2017, the Ukrainian government banned the use of VK in Ukraine. According to a study for May 2018 conducted by Factum Group Ukraine VK remained the fourth most viewed site in Ukraine, but Facebook was twice as much visited. For 2019, VK appeared as the most visited social network in Ukraine according to Alexa. According to the Internet Association of Ukraine the share of Ukrainian Internet users who visit VK daily had fallen from 54% to 10% from September 2016 to September 2019. They also claimed in November 2019 that Facebook was the most popular social network.

VK was expected to gain most of the users lost by Facebook and Instagram after they were blocked in Russia in 2022, according to a Calltouch poll.

Ownership

Initially, founder and CEO Pavel Durov owned 20% of shares (although he had majority voting power through proxy votes), and a trio of Russian-Israeli investors Yitzchak Mirilashvili, his father Mikhael Mirilashvili's and Lev Leviev owned 60%, 10%, and 10% respectively. The original founders then sold a stake of 39.99% to Mail.ru Group (formerly Digital Sky Technologies).

On 29 May 2012, Mail.ru Group announced its decision to yield control of the company to Durov by offering him the voting rights on its shares. Combined with Durov's personal 12% stake, this gave him 52% of the votes.

In April 2013, the Mirilashvili family sold its 40% share in VK to United Capital Partners for $1.12 billion, while Lev Leviev sold his 8% share in the same deal, giving United Capital Partners 48% ownership. In January 2014, VK's founder Pavel Durov sold his 12% stake in the company to Ivan Tavrin, the CEO of MegaFon, which is controlled by Alisher Usmanov. Following the deal, Usmanov and his allies controlled around 52% of the company. Shortly thereafter, the CEO of Megafon, sold his 12% stake to Mail.ru, thus allowing Mail.ru to consolidate its controlling stake of 52% in VK.

On 1 April 2014, Durov submitted his resignation to the board; at first, due to the fact the company confirmed he had resigned, it was believed to be related to the Russo-Ukrainian War which began in the previous February. However, Durov himself claimed it was an April Fool's Joke on 3 April 2014. On 21 April 2014, Durov was dismissed as CEO, claiming he failed to withdraw his letter of resignation a month earlier. Durov then claimed the company had been effectively taken over by Vladimir Putin's political faction, suggesting his dismissal was the result of both his refusal to hand over personal details of users to federal law enforcement and his refusal to hand over the personal details of people who were members of a VKontakte group dedicated to the Euromaidan protest movement. Durov then left Russia and stated that he had "no plans to go back" and that "the country is incompatible with Internet business at the moment".

On 16 September 2014, the Mail.ru group bought the remaining 48% stake of VK from United Capital Partners (UCP) for $1.5 billion, thus becoming the sole proprietor of the social network.

In December 2021, Russian state-owned bank Gazprombank and insurance company Sogaz bought out 57.3% of VK shares, thus becoming the holders of the company's controlling interest.

Controversies

Copyright issues

Litigation
In 2008, the leading Russian television channel TV Russia (TV channel name RTR used in 1991–2002, then Russia 1) and television company VGTRK sued VKontakte (then VK) over unlicensed copies of two of its films which had been uploaded by VK users. In 2010, this dispute was settled by the Russian Supreme Arbitration Court in favour of the social network. The court ruled that VK is not responsible for its users’ copyright violations, taking into account that both parties agreed with the technical possibility to identify the user who posted illegal content and who, consequently, must incur the liability. Another ruling early in 2012 went partially in favor of Gala Records (now Warner Music Russia), a recording studio, when the same court ordered VK to pay $7000 for not being active enough in regard to copyrighted materials.

Efforts against copyright infringement
VK offers a content removal tool for copyright holders. Large-scale copyright holders may gain access to bulk content removal tools.

Since 2010, VK has also entered several partnerships with legal content providers such as television networks. and streaming providers. Most notably, the Video on Demand provider Ivi.ru that has secured licensing rights with all Hollywood majors in 2012. These partnerships allow providers to remove user-uploaded content from VK and substitute it with legal embedded copies from the provider's site. This legal content can be either ad-sponsored, subscription-based, or free, depending on the provider's choices. VK does not display its own advertising in the site's music or video sections, nor in the videos themselves. In October 2013, VKontakte was cleared of copyright infringement charges by a court in Saint Petersburg. The judge ruled that the social network is not responsible for the content uploaded by its users.

In November 2014, the head of the Roskomnadzor, Maxim Ksenzov, said that VKontakte would complete the process of legalization of the content at the beginning of 2015. At that time (November 2014), negotiations between major label companies and the social network VKontakte were ongoing.

DDoS attacks on sites 
Because the social network is one of the most popular and visited sites in runet, its visits can be used to make DDoS attacks on smaller sites.
VK performed DDOS attacks on certain sites, making users' browsers send multiple requests to the target site without their consent. The targets were the Runet Prize voting page in 2008 and the CAPTCHA-solving service antigate.com in 2012. It was done by inserting an iframe and a piece of JavaScript code which periodically reloaded the iframe. As a countermeasure, antigate was detecting whether iframe was loaded from VK and if it were antigate had redirected request to xHamster, a pornography website. VK needed to cease the attack due to the site's use by children. VK tried to use XMLHttpRequest to solve this problem, but had forgotten about the same-origin policy. They succeeded in stopping the attack, though there were many ways to solve the problem with redirect.

Durov's dismissal
Durov was dismissed as CEO in April 2014 after he had failed to retract a letter of resignation. Durov contended that the resignation letter was an April fools prank. Durov then claimed Vladimir Putin's allies had, in effect, taken over the company, and suggested his ousting was the result of his refusal to hand over personal details of users to the Russian Federal Security Service and his refusal to shut down a VK group dedicated to anti-corruption activist Alexei Navalny.

Censorship
On 24 May 2013, it was reported in the media that the site had been mistakenly put on a list of websites banned by the Russian government. Some critics have accused the blacklist as the latest in a series of suspicious incidents to have happened to the website in recent months as a way for the Russian government to increase their stake in, and control of the site.

On 18 November 2013, following an order from the Court of Rome, VK was blocked in Italy after a complaint from Medusa Film stating that it was hosting an illegal copy of one of its films. However, in April 2015, the site was reopened for Italian users and its mobile app is available on both the App Store and Google Play.

In January 2016, China banned VKontakte, claiming that it was manipulating web content and cooperating with the Kremlin. According to Russia's media watchdog, the network estimates around 300,000 users based in China. As of 14 February 2018, China authorities unblocked VKontakte and it was fully accessible in the country.

In May 2017, Ukrainian President Petro Poroshenko signed a decree to impose a ban on Mail.ru and its widely used social networks including VKontakte and Odnoklassniki as part of its continued sanctions on Russia for its annexation of Crimea and involvement in the War in Donbas. Reporters Without Borders condemned the ban, calling it a "disproportionate measure that seriously undermines the Ukrainian people's right to information and freedom of expression." VK closed its office in Ukraine's capital Kyiv in June 2017.

In December 2021, VKontakte's CEO, Boris Dobrodeev resigned from his post. Reuters linked Dobrodeev's resignation to the acquisition of VK's majority interest by two state-owned companies that happened the same month. According to one analyst, the state consolidation of VKontakte would cause greater censorship by the government.

After Russian military invasion of Ukraine, on September 26, 2022, the VK application (as well as other applications of the holding services) was removed from the Apple App Store due to international sanctions. On September 28, the Russian communications regulator Roskomnadzor issued a statement demanding an explanation for the removal of the VK application from the App Store. CEO Vladimir Kiriyenko was sanctioned by the United States, Canada, United Kingdom, European Union, Japan, Australia and various countries.

Prosecution of users in Russia 
In July 2012, VKontakte was accused of close cooperation with the Centre for Combating Extremism (Centre E), a unit within the Russian Ministry of Internal Affairs heavily criticized for repressing opposition activists. For publications, reposts, comments and likes posted on their VKontakte pages, dozens of Russian citizens were sentenced to fines, suspended sentences and imprisonment. Most of the cases against users are qualified as propaganda of extremism, xenophobia and Nazism. Statistically, among all the social networking services available in Russia, the users of VKontakte were targeted by police almost exclusively.

Events and projects

Hackathons 
VK organized their first 24-hour Hackathon in 2015 from 31 October to 1 November. The participants were invited to develop projects united by a common idea: “Make it Simple!” (Russian: «Упрощайте!»). 34 teams took part in the competition. A prize pool of 300 thousand rubles was split among the winners.

The second VK Hackathon took place from 26 to 27 November 2016. The participants developed projects for the community app platform. The “Search for Lost Cats” (Russian: «Поиск пропавших котиков») app won the “Developers’ Choice” category. The prize pool for the event was 300 thousand rubles.

The third VK Hackathon took place from 20 to 22 October 2017 with 320 participants competing in the event. The prize pool was one million rubles. An application designed to help users navigate the State Hermitage Museum won the “Culture” category.

Start Fellows 
In 2011, Pavel Durov and Yuri Milner created Start Fellows, a grant program founded to support projects in the field of technology. In 2014, VK took over the Start Fellows program and made it more systematic. The grant was provided to 3 companies each month and included project consultation from VK along with 25 thousand rubles a month for advertisement on the VK platform. Winners of the grant include “University Schedules” (Russian: «Расписание вузов»), a scheduling app, LiveCamDroid, a mobile streaming service, HTML Academy, an educational project, and others.

VK re-launched the project in 2017. Only active projects with an earnings model could submit applications. 327 grant applications were received but only 67 of them passed the initial screening. The total prize pool was 2.5 million rubles.

VK Cup 
The first VK Cup, a programming championship for young programmers aged 13–23, was held on 16 July 2012 in Saint Petersburg, Russia.

VK and Codeforces co-organized the second VK Cup programming championship, which took place from 24 to 27 July 2015. The winners received a total of 1,048,576 rubles (an amount related to round binary numbers).

The third VK Cup took place from 1 to 4 July 2016 and had a prize pool of 2.5 million rubles.

VK and Codeforces co-organized the fourth VK Cup which took place from 8 to 9 July 2017. Teams from 52 countries applied to take part in the competition. The prize pool for the competition was 2.5 million rubles.

VK Music Awards 
The first VK Music Awards ceremony took place on 25 December 2017. The VK Music Awards were produced by Timur Bekmambetov and the Bazelevs Company with Pavel Volya hosting the event. The awards ceremony was held in the form of an online live stream. Any VK user could watch the broadcast live. After the ceremony, a private concert was held in the Vegas City Hall in Moscow. Tickets to the event could be won through a contest held in the VK Music community. VK Music Awards winners were determined by the number of plays an artist's song got on VK and the BOOM app. The names of the 30 award winners were published on the official VK Music Awards community page and on the BOOM app website. “Rosé Wine” (Allj and ), “Lambada” ( and Scriptonite), and “My Half” topped the list of most listened to songs. The official pages of all award winners have been marked with a special symbol.

VK Fest 
Since 2015, VK has held a yearly 2-day open-air music and entertainment festival. According to data from the organizer, 70 thousand people attended the festival in 2016, with the number rising to 85 thousand attendees in 2017. In 2017, around 40 artists and groups performed on 3 stages, including Little Big, The Hatters, and others. Bloggers and other famous individuals, such as Dmitry Grishin, Timur Bekmambetov, and Mikhail Piotrovsky (speakers at the 2017 festival), are also an important part of the festival. More than 1.5 million people watched the festival's official live stream.

See also

 Ambient awareness
 Cyworld
 Facebook
 Internet in Russia
 Myspace
 Qzone
 List of social networking websites

References

Literature

External links

Companies based in Saint Petersburg
Russian social networking websites
2006 establishments in Russia
Internet properties established in 2006
Notorious markets
Russian brands
Internet censorship in Ukraine
Social media